The 2019 Spielberg Formula 2 round was a pair of motor races for Formula 2 cars that took place on 29 and 30 June 2019 at the Red Bull Ring in Spielberg, in Austria as part of the FIA Formula 2 Championship. It was the sixth round of the 2019 FIA Formula 2 Championship and ran in support of the 2019 Austrian Grand Prix.

Background

Driver changes
Mahaveer Raghunathan received a one-race ban after reaching twelve penalty points on his racing license during the Paul Ricard feature race. His seat at MP Motorsport for the round was taken by Patricio O'Ward.

Elsewhere, Dorian Boccolacci was replaced at Campos Racing by Arjun Maini, and Ralph Boschung left Trident with Ryan Tveter taking his place for the round.

Classification

Qualifying

Feature race

Notes
 – Sérgio Sette Câmara was given a five-second time penalty for causing a collision.
 – Louis Delétraz was given a five-second time penalty for speeding in the pit lane.
 – Arjun Maini originally finished 15th but was disqualified after his tyres were found to have been fitted incorrectly before the race start.

Sprint race

Notes
 – Anthoine Hubert originally finished 16th but was given a five-second time penalty for causing a collision.
 – Jack Aitken was given a five-second time penalty for causing a collision and an additional five-second time penalty for a violation of the minimum delta time under the safety car.
 – Nyck de Vries and Sérgio Sette Câmara set the same fastest lap times, but de Vries was awarded the points for fastest lap as he was the first to achieve the lap time.

Championship standings after the round

Drivers' Championship standings

Teams' Championship standings

References

External links 
 

Red Bull Ring
Formula 2
Auto races in Austria
Red Bull Ring FIA Formula 2 round